Molla Qasem (also Romanized as Mollā Qāsem) is a village in Sarajuy-ye Sharqi Rural District, Saraju District, Maragheh County, East Azerbaijan Province, Iran. At the 2006 census, its population was 458, in 97 families.

References 

Towns and villages in Maragheh County